Carl Peterson (born 3 July 1987) is a former Australian rules football player, who with the Hawthorn Football Club in the Australian Football League. Peterson was also listed with the Richmond Football Club but didn't play a game for the club.

More recently, Peterson pulled on the boots for Perth Football League team SNESA. SNESA has attracted some big name AFL stars in recent times and Peterson was a catalyst to the moves.

Peterson was born in Meekatharra, Western Australia and moved to Kununurra when he was two, before moving to Perth to finish Year 12, where he trained and played football with the Clontarf Football Academy. He was then recruited by Claremont Football Club in the Western Australian Football League (WAFL). He played five games for Claremont in 2006, including two finals.

Peterson was originally drafted by Richmond in the 2006 AFL Draft. He was a fourth round pick, number 60 overall, but he was delisted by the Tigers at the end of the 2007 season without playing a game. Following this, he joined Northern Territory Football League (NTFL) club St Mary's and was in the Saints' 2007/08 premiership side.

He made his AFL debut in the opening round of the 2010 AFL season and performed well, kicking a goal and gathering 15 disposals in the first half before copping a heavy knock early in the second half. He played seventeen games for Hawthorn, all in 2010.

In 2012, Peterson signed to play for the Victorian Football League's Northern Blues.

Statistics

|- style=background:#EAEAEA
| 2007 ||  || 28
| 0 || — || — || — || — || — || — || — || — || — || — || — || — || — || — || 0
|-
| 2009 ||  || 48
| 0 || — || — || — || — || — || — || — || — || — || — || — || — || — || — || 0
|- style=background:#EAEAEA
| 2010 ||  || 48
| 17 || 13 || 9 || 131 || 89 || 220 || 73 || 53 || 0.8 || 0.5 || 7.7 || 5.2 || 12.9 || 4.3 || 3.1 || 0
|- class="sortbottom"
! colspan=3| Career
! 17 !! 13 !! 9 !! 131 !! 89 !! 220 !! 73 !! 53 !! 0.8 !! 0.5 !! 7.7 !! 5.2 !! 12.9 !! 4.3 !! 3.1 !! 0
|}

External links

Notes

Hawthorn Football Club players
Box Hill Football Club players
Claremont Football Club players
St Mary's Football Club (NTFL) players
Preston Football Club (VFA) players
1987 births
Living people
Australian rules footballers from Western Australia
People from Meekatharra, Western Australia
People from the Kimberley (Western Australia)
Indigenous Australian players of Australian rules football
Darwin Football Club players